Coiffaitarctia is a genus of moths in the family Erebidae. The genus was erected by Hervé de Toulgoët in 1990.

Species
Coiffaitarctia groisonae
Coiffaitarctia henrici
Coiffaitarctia ockendeni
Coiffaitarctia steniptera

References

 , 1990 [1991]: Description of new Neotropical Arctiidae with description of a new genus (Lepidoptera: Arctiidae: Arctiinae). Bulletin de la Société entomologique de France 95 (9-10): 291–296.

External links

Phaegopterina
Moth genera